Justin Harper (born August 30, 1989) is an American professional basketball player for Koshigaya Alphas of the Japanese B. League. Harper played professionally in the NBA for various teams, including the Orlando Magic, Detroit Pistons, and Philadelphia 76ers. He played college basketball for the University of Richmond.

College career
As a senior with Richmond, Harper averaged 17.9 points and 6.9 rebounds while shooting 53 percent from the field, and he was named to the first-team All-Atlantic 10, along with teammate Kevin Anderson. Harper was recognized as an All-Fourth District first-team selection by the National Association of Basketball Coaches.

Professional career 
Harper was selected with the 32nd overall pick in the 2011 NBA draft by the Cleveland Cavaliers, who subsequently traded his draft rights to the Orlando Magic. During the 2011 NBA lockout, Harper played in France for SIG Strasbourg of the Ligue Nationale de Basketball. On December 9, 2011, he signed with the Magic. On October 27, 2012, he was waived by the Magic.

On November 2, 2012, Harper was selected by the Idaho Stampede with the third overall pick in the 2012 NBA Development League Draft. He played in 48 games for Idaho in 2012–13, averaging 11.7 points and 6.5 rebounds per game.

On October 5, 2013, Harper signed with Hapoel Tel Aviv of Israel for the 2013–14 season. On September 10, 2014, he signed with Sidigas Avellino of Italy for the 2014–15 season.

On September 18, 2015, Harper signed with the Brooklyn Nets. However, he was later waived by the Nets on October 26 after appearing in six preseason games. On November 16, he was acquired by the Los Angeles D-Fenders of the D-League. The following day, he made his debut for the D-Fenders in a 114–105 win over the Bakersfield Jam, recording seven points and one rebound in 13 minutes. On January 29, 2016, he was named in the West All-Star team for the 2016 NBA D-League All-Star Game.

On February 24, 2016, Harper signed a 10-day contract with the Detroit Pistons. That night, he made his debut for the Pistons in a 111–91 win over the Philadelphia 76ers, recording one point and one steal in five minutes off the bench. On March 5, he signed a second 10-day contract with the Pistons. On March 15, the Pistons decided not to sign him for the remainder of the season. He subsequently returned to the D-Fenders and played out the rest of the 2016–17 season with them.

Harper re-joined the D-Fenders for the 2016–17 season. On March 3, 2017, he signed a 10-day contract with the Philadelphia 76ers. After the 10-day contract expired, Harper was reacquired by the D-Fenders.

Harper re-joined the D-Fenders, this time re-branded as the South Bay Lakers.

On April 25, 2019, Harper joined Indios de Mayagüez. On August 28, 2020, Harper signed in Japan with Kyoto Hannaryz.

Career statistics

NBA

Regular season

|-
| style="text-align:left;"| 
| style="text-align:left;"| Orlando
| 14 || 0 || 6.0 || .290 || .154 || .000 || .9 || .1 || .1 || .2 || 1.4
|- 
| style="text-align:left;"| 
| style="text-align:left;"| Detroit
| 5 || 0 || 7.0 || .400 || .444 || .500 || .2 || .0 || .2 || .0 || 2.6
|-
| style="text-align:left;"| 
| style="text-align:left;"| Philadelphia
| 3 || 0 || 10.0 || .417 || .286 || .000 || 2.0 || .0 || .7 || .0 || 4.0
|- class="sortbottom"
| style="text-align:center;" colspan="2"| Career
| 22 || 0 || 6.8 || .340 || .276 || .333 || .9 || .2 || .1 || .1 || 2.0

Playoffs

|-
| style="text-align:left;"| 2012
| style="text-align:left;"| Orlando
| 1 || 0 || 5.0 || .000 || .000 || .000 || .0 || .0 || .0 || .0 || .0
|- class="sortbottom"
| style="text-align:center;" colspan="2"| Career
| 1 || 0 || 5.0 || .000 || .000 || .000 || .0 || .0 || .0 || .0 || .0

Japan

Regular season

|-
| style="text-align:left;"| 2020–21
| style="text-align:left;"| Kyoto
| 34 || 30 || 25.4 || .494 || .377 || .800 || 6.6 || 1.2 || .6 || .5 || 12.7
|- 
| style="text-align:left;"| 2021–22
| style="text-align:left;"| Kyoto
| 54 || 53 || 32.4 || .512 || .377 || .733 || 8.5 || 1.7 || .6 || .6 || 19.1
|- 

Source: basketball-stats.de (Date: May 27, 2022)

References

External links

Richmond Spiders bio
Justin Harper Profile

1989 births
Living people
American expatriate basketball people in France
American expatriate basketball people in Israel
American expatriate basketball people in Italy
American expatriate basketball people in Japan
American expatriate basketball people in the Philippines
American men's basketball players
Basketball players from Richmond, Virginia
Centers (basketball)
Cleveland Cavaliers draft picks
Detroit Pistons players
Hapoel Tel Aviv B.C. players
Idaho Stampede players
Kyoto Hannaryz players
Lega Basket Serie A players
Los Angeles D-Fenders players
NorthPort Batang Pier players
Orlando Magic players
Philadelphia 76ers players
Philippine Basketball Association imports
Power forwards (basketball)
Richmond Spiders men's basketball players
S.S. Felice Scandone players
SIG Basket players
South Bay Lakers players